Tetracis pallidata is a moth of the family Geometridae first described by Clifford D. Ferris in 2009. It is found in British Columbia, Idaho and Washington.

Habitats are mixed riparian forest (cottonwood with aspen and willows intermingled with choke cherry) in sage-shrub steppe, riparian in the ecotone between ponderosa pine and shrub steppe, and in Owyhee County in Idaho, sage-shrub steppe with juniper and mountain mahogany (Cercocarpus ledifolius).

The length of the forewings 20–23 mm. Adults are on wing from mid-September into early October.

Larvae have been reared on Ribes species.

External links
Revision of the North American genera Tetracis Guenée and synonymization of Synaxis Hulst with descriptions of three new species (Lepidoptera: Geometridae: Ennominae)

Tetracis
Moths described in 2009